HAT-P-15 is a G-type main-sequence star about 630 light-years away. The star is older than Sun yet has a concentration of heavy elements roughly 190% of solar abundance. The star has no noticeable starspot activity.

The spectroscopic survey in 2015 have failed to find any stellar companions to it, yet imaging survey have identified a possibly two companion red dwarf stars at projected separations 1210 and 1370 AU, respectively. 

The star was named Berehynia in December 2019 by the Ukrainian amateur astronomers.

Planetary system
In 2010 a transiting hot superjovian planet b (named Tryzub in 2019) was detected. It has an equilibrium temperature of  904 K. The orbital simulation shown the planets inward of orbit of b would in-spiral and be destroyed within time-span of less than billion years. The planetary orbit is well aligned with the equatorial plane of the star, misalignment equal to 13 degrees.

References

Perseus (constellation)
G-type main-sequence stars
Planetary systems with one confirmed planet
Planetary transit variables
J04245952+3927382